Militello is a surname. Notable people with this surname include:

 Jennifer Militello, American academic, writer and poet
 Muriel Marland-Militello (born 1943), French politician and former member of the National Assembly of France
 Robert Philip Militello (born 1950), American jazz saxophonist and flautist, and former member of the Dave Brubeck Quartet 
 Sam Salvatore Militello Jr. (born 1969), American former Major League Baseball pitcher